All My Life is a 2009 Philippine television drama romance series broadcast by GMA Network. Directed by Mac Alejandre and Andoy Ranay, it stars Aljur Abrenica and Kris Bernal. It premiered on June 29, 2009 on the network's Telebabad line up. The series concluded on September 18, 2009 with a total of 60 episodes. It was replaced by Ikaw Sana in its timeslot.

Cast and characters

Lead cast
 Kris Bernal as Romina Estrella
 Aljur Abrenica as Jules Romualdez

Supporting cast
 Manilyn Reynes as Sally Estrella
 Gelli de Belen as Amelia Dela Paz-Estrella
 Zoren Legaspi as Romano Estrella
 Lani Mercado as Marita Castor-Romualdez
 Jay Manalo as Gary Romualdez
 Byron Ortile as Luigi Romualdez
 Martin Delos Santos as Maui Romualdez
 Stef Prescott as Nicole
 Jade Lopez as Lindsay
 Jay Aquitania as August
 Jenny Miller as Dessa
 Paulo Avelino as Perry
 LJ Reyes as Maricar
 Gladys Guevarra as Luningning
 Chris Cayzer as Joseph
 Bryan Termulo as Dino
 Moymoy Obeso as Calo
 Roadfil Obeso as Totoy

Guest cast
 Matteo Guidicelli as Matt
 Lloyd Samartino as Gilbert
 Renz Valerio as Luke Estrella
 Yasmien Kurdi as Princess

Ratings
According to AGB Nielsen Philippines' Mega Manila household television ratings, the pilot episode of All My Life earned a 23.6% rating. While the final episode scored a 22.7% rating.

References

External links
 

2009 Philippine television series debuts
2009 Philippine television series endings
Filipino-language television shows
GMA Network drama series
Philippine romance television series
Television shows set in the Philippines